Uvalde Consolidated Independent School District (UCISD) is a public school district based in Uvalde, Texas, US. Located in Uvalde County, the district extends into portions of Zavala and Real counties. In addition to Uvalde, the district serves the communities of Batesville in Zavala County, and Uvalde Estates in Uvalde County.

In 2009, the school district was rated "academically acceptable" by the Texas Education Agency. The district superintendent is Dr. Hal Harrell.

History

In 1949, the Batesville Independent School District began sending its students to Uvalde High School.

In 1970, students held a strike and filed a lawsuit against the district's board of trustees, accusing the group of not responding to complaints filed by parents, who requested Spanish-language medium communications and giving appropriate accommodations to English as a second language learners instead of classifying them as having deficiencies in their intelligence. An employee also accused the school board of not hearing grievances.

In 1973, Batesville ISD merged into Uvalde CISD.

2022 school shooting 

On May 24, 2022, a gunman killed 19 students and two teachers and wounded 17 others at Robb Elementary School. On June 3, 2022, UCISD Superintendent Hal Harrel stated that Robb Elementary School would not be reopened and its building demolished, to avoid renewing traumas related to the shooting.

Police department
The Uvalde Consolidated Independent School District Police Department is the police force with primary jurisdiction over Uvalde CISD property.

In February 2020, the district's Board of Trustees approved Pedro "Pete" Arredondo as new Chief of Police of the UCISD Police Department. , Arredondo commanded a team of six officers.

Following the Robb Elementary School shooting on May 24, 2022, the Uvalde Consolidated Independent School District Police Department was criticized for its response to the incident.

In early July 2022, Chief of Police Pete Arredondo resigned from his city council position.

On August 24, 2022, the board of the school district fired Arredondo from his job as police chief by unanimous vote.

List of schools
Dalton Early Childhood Center (PK–1)
Historically Dalton was the school for students of non-Hispanic white backgrounds.
Anthon Elementary (Grades 1–2; defunct)
Robb Elementary School (Grades 2–4; permanently closed)  
Historically Robb was the school for students of Mexican origins. However before the 1970s the principal and almost all of the staff were non-Spanish speakers and were non-Hispanic white. Parents began to protest by withdrawing children from the school, in April 1970, after the school chose not to renew the contract of its only teacher of Mexican origins. By May 2022, because of a flight of non-Hispanic white residents, 90% of the school's students were Hispanic or Latino.
Flores Elementary (Grades 5–6)
Batesville School (PK–6)
Uvalde Dual Language Academy (PK–6)
Morales Junior High (Grade 7–8)
Crossroads Academy (Grades 9–12)
Uvalde Early College HS (Grades 9–12)
Uvalde High School (Grades 9–12)
Uvalde Elementary (Grades 3-4) (former Benson complex)

References

External links
 

School districts in Uvalde County, Texas
School districts in Real County, Texas
School districts in Zavala County, Texas
Uvalde, Texas